Lander Institute is a Jewish private institution of higher education, founded by Touro College . 
The school is located in Givat Shaul .

The institution began operating in August 2004 and is named after Professor Bernard Lander, founder of Touro College in New York. The institute has two campuses, one for the secular population and the other for the Orthodox population.

In addition, the institute consists of the advanced enhancement Department in English (Lander Institute - the English Division) which offers professional enrichment courses in various fields such as Real estate, Asset management, Digital photography, Graphic design, Interior design, Web design , Internet marketing, Microsoft certification programs, Innovation, entrepreneurship, and Computer programming languages courses.

Lander Institute ("Machon Lander" in Hebrew) is an Israeli institution of higher education consisting of:

 School of Business Administration.
 School of the Land of Israel and Jerusalem.
 School of Education and Social Studies.
 School of Jewish Studies.
 External studies unit.
 The English Division.

Lander Institute is recognized by the Council for Higher Education in Israel as an institution authorized to grant:

 Bachelor's degree (B.A) in Business Administration.
 Master's degree (M.A) in Jewish Studies.
 Bachelor's degree (B.A) in the study of "The Land of Israel and Jerusalem".
 Bachelor's degree (B.A) in education and society.
 Master's degree in business administration (MBA).

History 

Lander Institute began operating in August 2004 and is named after Professor Bernard Lander, the founder of Touro College in New York. At first the institute acted as an extension campus of Touro College, New York which gave American degrees in Israel.

In 2006 the institute received the approval of the Council for Higher Education in Israel to become an independent Israeli private Institute of higher education and to award Israeli degrees recognized by them.

Schools and departments

School of Business Administration
The School of Business Administration at the Lander Institute offers its students a variety of courses to study and an attractive complex of four professional specialties and a large selection of courses and practical Studies. The school aims to enrich the students world of knowledge, to provide them with tools to successfully deal with the management challenges of the 21st century and thus to design a new generation of successful managers and leaders. The fact that 40% of the students who are studying towards a B.A in Business Administration across Jerusalem are enrolled at Lander Institute proves the ability of the school to give their students the necessary tools to success in today's global world. 
The School of Business Administration also provides a master's degree in Business Administration MBA.

School of the Land of Israel and Jerusalem
The School of the Land of Israel and Jerusalem provides a B.A. in Land of Israel and Jerusalem. . The Uniqueness of the program is the fact that it focuses recesses of the population, the community and society and incorporates regional studies and surveys in the field.

School of Education and Society
The School of Education and Social provides higher education undergraduate course of study in education and society. The studies in the Department of Education and Society expose learners to the difficulties and challenges of today's education system. The school analysis the social policy processes, educational testing assumptions and theoretical aspects as well as directional action and decision-making.

School of Jewish Studies
The School of Jewish Studies combines academic study with high-level commitment to Jewish tradition and values that provide its graduates with a bachelor's and master's degree in Judaism from an accredited institution.
The school dives into the depths of Judaism in the best elements such as:
 Biblical Studies
 Oral tradition
 History of Israel
 Jewish philosophy
 Jewish education

External Studies Unit

The External studies unit offers the public a rich variety of professional enrichment courses through their departments:
 Department of Tourism
 Department of computer graphics and interactive media
 Department of Real Estate
 Department of Education Management and Marketing
 Department of Jewish studies

The English Division

The Department of English Division offers professional enrichment courses in various fields such as:
 Real Estate
 Property Management
 Digital Photography
 Graphic design
 Interior design
 Web design
 Internet marketing
 Microsoft certification programs
 Practical innovation and entrepreneurship
 Computer programming languages

References

Educational institutions established in 2004
2004 establishments in Israel
Touro University System
Universities and colleges in Jerusalem